Krui may refer to:

Krui language, the language of the Indonesian province of Lampung, Sumatra
Krui, Pesisir Barat Regency, Indonesia

See also
KRUI (disambiguation)
Kruis, a surname